Shamgarh is a town and a nagar panchayat in Mandsaur district in the Indian state of Madhya Pradesh.

Demographics
 India census, Shamgarh had a population of 21,455. Males constitute 52% of the population and females 48%. Shamgarh has an average literacy rate of 69%, higher than the national average of 59.5%: male literacy is 79%, and female literacy is 59%. In Shamgarh, 15% of the population is under 6 years of age.

References

Cities and towns in Mandsaur district